Kongu Vellala Goundergal Peravai is a caste organization in the Indian state of Tamil Nadu. It exists for the Kongu Vellalar Gounder or Vellala Gounder community.

Origins and platform
The organization was founded in 1988 at Chennai. In 2009 it launched its own political party, the Kongunadu Munnetra Kazhagam (also referred to as the Kongunadu Munnetra Peravai). The organization is known for its strong stance against inter-caste hypogamy.

Kongu Nadu Statehood movement

The Kongu Vellala Goundergal Peravaipassed a resolution in favor of formation of Kongu Nadu state by bifurcating Tamil Nadu.

References

External links
 Website of Kongu Vellala Goundergal Peravai organisations

Organisations based in Coimbatore
1988 establishments in Tamil Nadu
Organizations established in 1988